The 1923 Cork Senior Hurling Championship was the 35th staging of the Cork Senior Hurling Championship since its establishment by the Cork County Board in 1887. The draw for the opening round fixtures took place on 18 April 1923.

St. Finbarr’s were the defending champions.

On 9 September 1923, St. Finbarr’s won the championship following a 0-05 to 1-02 defeat of Blackrock in the final. This was their seventh championship title overall and their second title in succession.

Results

Semi-finals

Final

References

Cork Senior Hurling Championship
Cork Senior Hurling Championship